The National Flag Anthem of the Republic of China, also unofficially known as the "National Banner Song", is a patriotic song typically played during the raising and lowering of the flag of the Republic of China. Domestically, the flag anthem is typically played immediately following the National Anthem of the Republic of China during flag ceremonies. It is also played at international sporting events such as the World Baseball Classic and Olympic Games, where Taiwan participates officially under the name of Chinese Taipei. The song is thus considered to be effectively a secondary national anthem; Republic of China (Taiwan) nationals and other ROC supporters stand when it is performed and salute it as they would salute the national anthem.

Origin 
After the Kuomintang Anthem became the de facto National Anthem of the Republic of China in 1930, the Ministry of Education had invited submissions for a new official national anthem. The music composed by Huang Tzu was eventually chosen in 1936, but the Nationalist Government refused to adopt it as the national anthem. As a compromise, the National Anthem remained unchanged, while Huang Tzu's music was adopted as the National Flag Anthem, with lyrics written in Classical Chinese by Tai Chi-tao, who had also contributed to the lyrics of the National Anthem.

Dispute of the author of lyrics 
According to Liu Yiling from the National Library of the Republic of China, there remains a dispute over the authorship of the lyrics. In some earlier publications, the lyrics were attributed as an anonymous work. However, later publications attributed it to Tai Chi-tao, who did compose a song with the title "National Flag Anthem" in 1928. Nevertheless, that work was very different from the current version. In 1929, Liang Desuo published "Blue Sky, White Sun, and a Wholly Red Earth", and some attribute the authorship of the National Flag Anthem to him due to the resemblance between that work and the current lyrics.

Use 
Since 1983, the song (officially with different lyrics) was used at Olympic competitions instead of the National Anthem due to pressure from the Chinese Olympic Committee and the International Olympic Committee. This also changed the symbols used by Taiwan during the Olympics and other sporting events, and their name officially changed to "Chinese Taipei" (中華臺北). During the 2004 Summer Olympics, Chinese Taipei won its first gold medals, and the Banner Song was played at the ceremonial raising of the flag of the gold medal team. When introduced, the song is officially called the "National Anthem of Chinese Taipei." However, in the 16th Asian Games held in Guangzhou, China, the song was introduced as the "Anthem of the Chinese Taipei Olympic Committee" (中華臺北奧會會歌), with new lyrics written by Chang Pi-te (張彼德).
In schools and national monuments in Taiwan, the National Anthem and the National Flag Anthem are played every morning before classes or opening at an outdoor ceremony. The national anthem is sung while the flag is being held before raising and the National Flag Anthem is played when the National Flag is raised. When the flag is lowered, only the National Flag Anthem is played.

During the 2017 Summer Universiade held in Taipei, Taiwan, the song was introduced as the "National Anthem of Chinese Taipei."

Lyrics

Original

For use as Chinese Taipei in Olympic Events 
Chinese Taipei Olympic Committee's Anthem share the same melody with the flag anthem, but with different lyrics wrote by Chang Pi-te. The lyrics was certified by IOC in 1983.

See also 

 Chinese Taipei
 Flag of the Republic of China
 National Anthem of the Republic of China

References

External links 
 National Flag Anthem Orchestral Version Ministry of Foreign Affairs, Republic of China.
 National Flag Anthem Chorus Version Ministry of Foreign Affairs, Republic of China.
 National Flag Anthem of the Republic of China

Asian anthems
National symbols of Taiwan
Chinese patriotic songs
Flag anthems
National symbols of the Republic of China (1912–1949)